Mirrat-ul-Arifeen International is a monthly Urdu research magazine that has been continuously publishing since April 2000 from Lahore, Punjab, Pakistan. The magazine publishes articles on global issues, current affairs, teachings of Islam, Quran, Sunnah, Ideology of Pakistan, Social issues, Kashmir issue, Sufism, teachings of Abdul Qadir Gilani and Sultan Bahoo, Iqbaliat, problems of the Islamic world and their solutions, challenges facing by the Islamic Republic of Pakistan, and other intellectual and scientific topics. Special issues are also published.

Name 
The name of monthly Mirrat-ul-Arifeen International is inspired by a famous book of the grandson of Muhammad Imam Hussain "Mirrat-ul-Arifeen". "Mirrat" means "Mirror" and Arif (singular of Arifeen) "is one who knows and recognizes Allah Almighty". The purpose of naming "Mirrat-ul-Arifeen" is to publish this magazine in relation to Sultan-ul-Arifeen, Sultan Bahoo and to present the teachings of other mystics (Sufis) in this mirror (monthly magazine).

Mirrat-ul-Arifeen was launched from Shrine of Sultan Bahoo at the platform of "Islahi Jamaat and Aalmi Tanzeem-ul-Arifeen". It was formally  established in April 2000 under the supervision and guidance of its founder Sultan Muhammad Asghar Ali.

See also 
Global Science
 List of magazines in Pakistan

References 

2000 establishments in Pakistan
Magazines established in 2000
Magazines published in Pakistan
Monthly magazines published in Pakistan
Urdu-language magazines